Juan Manuel Frutos (June 12, 1879 – April 15, 1960) was a Paraguayan lawyer and politician. He served as the 36th President of Paraguay on a provisional basis, from June 3, 1948 to August 15, 1948. Holding the position of President of the Supreme Court of Justice, he assumed as Provisional President of Paraguay after the resignation of Higinio Morinigo. 

He was born in Asunción on June 12, 1879. His parents were José Dolores Frutos and Juliana Escurra, sister of the Colonel Juan Antonio Escurra (ex-president of Paraguay).

His life 
He started in politics since very young age; he participated in many politic riots in the time. He also developed a promising judicial career, which led him to be president of the Legislative Power later. In 1895 he got in the National School of the Capital. In this institution he studied with great teachers such as Cleto Romero, who was also the Principal. His teacher of civic education and philosophy was Emeterio González, other teachers he had were: Manuel Domínguez, Manuel Fernández Sánchez, Jorge López Moreira, Blas Garay, Manuel Franco and the teacher of rhetoric and literature, Manuel Gondra.

Studies
He graduated from high school on March 1, 1901. He went to study Law and Social Sciences in the National University of Asunción in 1903. He graduated with a Doctor degree in 1912; his thesis was about “The prohibition of retaining property”. Parallel to his studies he was secretary of the Commission of Public Work, guide teacher in the National School of the Capital, Fiscal Agent in civil matters. The year of this graduation he organized the 7th battalion of the National Guard, from which he became Commander later.

In his youth can be seen an unquestionable calling of service and a flawless behavior that later would make him outstand.

He directed several newspapers and wrote about politics. For a time, he was exiled to Corrientes, Argentina, from where he wrote for “¡Luchad!” (Fight?!). He worked as a journalist for “General Caballero”, “El Sufragio” (The Suffrage), “El Colegiado” (The Scholar), which led him to suffer several repercussions and even being sent to prison in several occasions. He died in Asunción, on April 15, 1960.

His government
The Legislative Assembly gathered and appointed Juan Manuel as successor of President Higinio Morínigo, after his government was overthrown because there was speculation that he might want to prolong his term of office with the support of arms. Juan Manuel assumed the presidency on June 3, 1948 and held the position until August 15, 1948, when he gave it to Natalicio González. His government lasted two months and twelve days.

During his government he declared August 16 “Day of the Paraguayan Children”, something that was proposed for Professor Andrés Aguirre, who was Director of Information for the Presidency in that moment. On August 13, 1948 the Ministry of Justice and Work was created. Other matters of importance during his period of time were the “Legal Regimen of Intellectual Property” and the creation of the “National Culture Institute”. Other decrees worth mentioning are the “nationalization of the electric power and train services” and one by which is given the “National Order to the Merit” to philosopher and professor, Enrique Molina.

Words of Juan Manuel Frutos
“I will make my best effort to accomplish the pacification of the spirits, the respect of the law and the wellbeing of the Paraguayan family”.

It was said that Juan Manuel Frutos governed like a “karai a lo yma” (an old fashion true gentleman), a president like it would never be seen again in the country.

Political career
He was a very active man in politics since very young, he participated in many riots in his time. He belonged to the Republican National Party (ANR) and was president of the Supreme Court. On April 30, 1906 he subscribed the act from the foundation of the League of the Independent Youth. He participated in the rebellion of Laureles in 1909, as adjutant of Colonel Escurra. During the short government of Pedro P. Peña he was appointed civilian and military delegate of the campaign. He was delegate for his party and in 1923 he completed his studies in the ANR, along with O’Leary and Dr. Ramírez. In 1947 he was member of the committee of civil defense.

On April 28, 1917 he presented a project in which he required the Executive Power to do a copy of all the records of habeas corpus that were presented and the insubordinations to the dispositions of the Supreme Court in this matter. On June 19, 1930 he presented an initiative that tended to the abolition of the article in the Civil Code that allowed the “pact of resale” because he said it caused harm to the private property of the weakest economical classes. He also asked the modification of several other articles in the Constitution and the introduction of some others. On July 12, 1947 he was appointed as President of the Supreme Court of Justice after the death of Juan León Mallorquín. On May 2, 1949 he promoted the First Judicial Congress; on 1956 he promoted the second one.

In November 1949 Frutos resigned to the Court, after a representative commission of the Red Party asked him to do it in his own home. He denied the request, but they still managed to take him out of the position, not without him arranging an affidavit expressing the illegal situation.

References

1879 births
1960 deaths
People from Asunción
Presidents of Paraguay
Paraguayan judges
Colorado Party (Paraguay) politicians
Universidad Nacional de Asunción alumni
20th-century Paraguayan lawyers